The German Revolution or November Revolution was a civil conflict in the German Empire at the end of the First World War that resulted in the replacement of the German federal constitutional monarchy with a democratic parliamentary republic that later became known as the Weimar Republic. The revolutionary period lasted from November 1918 until the adoption of the Weimar Constitution in August 1919. Among the factors leading to the revolution were the extreme burdens suffered by the German population during the four years of war, the economic and psychological impacts of the German Empire's defeat by the Allies, and growing social tensions between the general population and the aristocratic and bourgeois elite.

The first acts of the revolution were triggered by the policies of the Supreme Command of the German Army and its lack of coordination with the Naval Command. In the face of defeat, the Naval Command insisted on trying to precipitate a climactic pitched battle with the British Royal Navy utilizing its naval order of 24 October 1918, but the battle never took place. Instead of obeying their orders to begin preparations to fight the British, German sailors led a revolt in the naval ports of Wilhelmshaven on 29 October 1918, followed by the Kiel mutiny in the first days of November. These disturbances spread the spirit of civil unrest across Germany and ultimately led to the proclamation of a republic to replace the imperial monarchy on 9 November 1918, two days before Armistice Day. Shortly thereafter, Emperor Wilhelm II fled the country and abdicated his throne.

The revolutionaries, inspired by communist and socialist ideas, did not hand over power to Soviet-style councils as the Bolsheviks had done in Russia, because the leadership of the Social Democratic Party of Germany (SPD) opposed their creation. The SPD opted instead for a national assembly that would form the basis for a parliamentary system of government. Fearing an all-out civil war in Germany between militant workers and reactionary conservatives, the SPD did not plan to strip the old German upper classes completely of their power and privileges. Instead, it sought to peacefully integrate them into the new social democratic system. In this endeavour, SPD leftists sought an alliance with the German Supreme Command. The same alliance of political forces succeeded in suppressing leftist uprisings in other parts of Germany, with the result that the country was completely pacified by late 1919.

The first elections for the new Constituent German National Assembly (popularly known as the Weimar National Assembly) were held on 19 January 1919, and the revolution effectively ended on 11 August 1919, when the Constitution of the German Reich (Weimar Constitution) was adopted.

SPD and the World War 
In the decade after 1900, the Social Democratic Party of Germany (SPD) was the leading force in Germany's labour movement. With 35% of the national votes and 110 seats in the Reichstag elected in 1912, the Social Democrats had grown into the largest political party in Germany. Party membership was around one million, and the party newspaper (Vorwärts) attracted 1.5 million subscribers. The trade unions had 2.5 million members, most of whom probably supported the Social Democrats. In addition, there were numerous co-operative societies (for example, apartment co-ops and shop co-ops) and other organizations either directly linked to the SPD and the labor unions or at least adhering to Social Democratic ideology. Other notable parties in the Reichstag of 1912 were the Catholic Centre Party (91 seats), the German Conservative Party (43), the National Liberal Party (45), the Progressive People's Party (42), the Polish Party (18), the German Reich Party (14), the Economic Union (10), and the Alsace-Lorraine Party (9).

At the congresses of the Second Socialist International beginning in 1889, the SPD had always agreed to resolutions asking for combined action of Socialists in case of a war. Following the assassination of Archduke Franz Ferdinand in Sarajevo, the SPD, like other socialist parties in Europe, organised anti-war demonstrations during the July Crisis. After Rosa Luxemburg called for disobedience and rejection of war in the name of the entire party as a representative of the left wing of the party, the Imperial government planned to arrest the party leaders immediately at the onset of war. Friedrich Ebert, one of the two party leaders since 1913, travelled to Zürich with Otto Braun to save the party's funds from being confiscated.

After Germany declared war on the Russian Empire on 1 August 1914, the majority of the SPD newspapers shared the general enthusiasm for the war (the "Spirit of 1914"), particularly because they viewed the Russian Empire as the most reactionary and anti-socialist power in Europe. In the first days of August, the editors believed themselves to be in line with the late August Bebel, who had died the previous year. In 1904, he declared in the Reichstag that the SPD would support an armed defence of Germany against a foreign attack. In 1907, at a party convention in Essen, he even promised that he himself would "shoulder the gun" if it was to fight against Russia, the "enemy of all culture and all the suppressed". In the face of the general enthusiasm for the war among the population, which foresaw an attack by the Entente powers, many SPD deputies worried they might lose many of their voters with their consistent pacifism. German Chancellor Theobald von Bethmann Hollweg rejected plans by high-ranking military officials to dissolve the SPD at the start of the war and exploited the anti-Russian stance of the SPD to procure the party's approval for it.

The party leadership and the party's deputies were split on the issue of support for the war: 96 deputies, including Friedrich Ebert, approved the war bonds demanded by the Imperial government. There were 14 deputies, headed by the second party leader, Hugo Haase, who spoke out against the bonds, but nevertheless followed party voting instructions and raised their hands in favour.

Thus, the entire SPD faction in the Reichstag voted in favour of the war bonds on 4 August 1914. It was with those decisions by the party and the unions that the full mobilisation of the German Army became possible. Haase explained the decision against his will with the words: "We will not let the fatherland alone in the hour of need!" The Emperor welcomed the so-called "truce" (Burgfrieden), declaring: "Ich kenne keine Parteien mehr, ich kenne nur noch Deutsche!" ("I no longer see parties, I see only Germans!").

Even Karl Liebknecht, who became one of the most outspoken opponents of the war, initially followed the line of the party that his father, Wilhelm Liebknecht, had cofounded: he abstained from voting and did not defy his own political colleagues. However, a few days later he joined the Gruppe Internationale (Group International) that Rosa Luxemburg had founded on 5 August 1914 with Franz Mehring, Ernst Meyer, Wilhelm Pieck, and others from the left wing of the party, which adhered to the prewar resolutions of the SPD. From that group emerged the Spartacus League (Spartakusbund) on 1 January 1916.

On 2 December 1914, Liebknecht voted against further war bonds, the only deputy of any party in the Reichstag to do so. Although he was not permitted to speak in the Reichstag to explain his vote, what he had planned to say was made public through the circulation of a leaflet that was claimed to be unlawful:

The present war was not willed by any of the nations participating in it and it is not waged in the interest of the Germans or any other people. It is an imperialist war, a war for capitalist control of the world market, for the political domination of huge territories and to give scope to industrial and banking capital.

Because of high demand, this leaflet was soon printed and evolved into the so-called "Political Letters", collections of which were later published in defiance of the censorship laws under the name "Spartacus Letters" (Spartakusbriefe). As of December 1916, these were replaced by the journal Spartakus, which appeared irregularly until November 1918.

This open opposition against the party line put Liebknecht at odds with some party members around Haase who were against the war bonds themselves. In February 1915, at the instigation of the SPD party leadership, Liebknecht was conscripted for military service to dispose of him, the only SPD deputy to be so treated. Because of his attempts to organise objectors against the war, he was expelled from the SPD, and in June 1916, he was sentenced on a charge of high treason to four years in prison. While Liebknecht was in the army, Rosa Luxemburg wrote most of the "Spartacus Letters". After serving a prison sentence, she was put back in jail under "preventive detention" until the war ended.

SPD's split 
As the war dragged on and the death tolls rose, more SPD members began to question the adherence to the Burgfrieden (the truce in domestic politics) of 1914. The SPD also objected to the domestic misery that followed the dismissal of Erich von Falkenhayn as Chief of the General Staff in 1916. His replacement, Paul von Hindenburg, introduced the Hindenburg Programme by which the guidelines of German policy were de facto set by the Supreme Army Command, not the emperor and the chancellor. Hindenburg's subordinate, Erich Ludendorff, took on broad responsibilities for directing wartime policies that were extensive. Although the Emperor and Hindenburg were his nominal superiors, it was Ludendorff who made the important decisions. Hindenburg and Ludendorff persisted with ruthless strategies aimed at achieving military victory, pursued expansionist and aggressive war goals and subjugated civilian life to the needs of the war and the war economy. For the labour force, that often meant 12-hour work days at minimal wages with inadequate food. The Auxiliary Service Law forced all men not in the armed forces to work.

After the outbreak of the Russian February Revolution in 1917, the first organised strikes erupted in German armament factories in March and April, with about 300,000 workers going on strike. The strike was organized by a group called the Revolutionary Stewards (Revolutionäre Obleute), led by their spokesman Richard Müller. The group emerged from a network of left-wing unionists who disagreed with the support of the war that came from the union leadership. The American entry into World War I on 6 April 1917 threatened further deterioration in Germany's military position. Hindenburg and Ludendorff had called for an end to the moratorium on attacks on neutral shipping in the Atlantic, which had been imposed when the Lusitania, a British ship carrying US citizens, was sunk off Ireland in 1915. Their decision signaled a new strategy to stop the flow of US materiel to France to make a German victory (or at least a peace settlement on German terms) possible before the United States entered the war as a combatant. The emperor tried to appease the population in his Easter address of 7 April by promising democratic elections in Prussia after the war, but lack of progress in bringing the war to a satisfactory end dulled its effect. Opposition to the war among munitions workers continued to rise, and what had been a united front in favour of the war split into two sharply divided groups.

After the SPD leadership under Friedrich Ebert excluded the opponents of the war from his party, the Spartacists joined with so-called revisionists such as Eduard Bernstein and centrists such as Karl Kautsky to found the fully anti-war Independent Social Democratic Party of Germany (USPD) under the leadership of Hugo Haase on 9 April 1917. The SPD was now known as the Majority Social Democratic Party of Germany (MSPD) and continued to be led by Friedrich Ebert. The USPD demanded an immediate end to the war and a further democratisation of Germany but did not have a unified agenda for social policies. The Spartacist League, which until then had opposed a split of the party, now made up the left wing of the USPD. Both the USPD and the Spartacists continued their anti-war propaganda in factories, especially in the armament plants.

Impact of the Russian Revolution 

After the February Revolution in Russia and the abdication of Tsar Nicholas II on 15 March 1917, the Russian Provisional Government, led by Alexander Kerensky as of 21 July 1917, continued the war on the side of the Entente powers. Nevertheless, Russian society was severely strained by the opposing motivations of patriotism and anti-war sentiment. There was sizable support for continuing the war to defend Russia's honour and territory, but also a strong desire to remove Russia from the conflict and let the other countries of Europe destroy one another without Russian involvement.

The German Imperial Government now saw one more chance for victory. To support the anti-war sentiment in Russia and perhaps turn the tide in Russia toward a separate peace, it permitted the leader of the Russian Bolsheviks, Vladimir Lenin, to pass in a sealed train wagon from his place of exile in Switzerland through Germany, Sweden and Finland to Petrograd. Since he had heard about the February Revolution, Lenin had been scheming on how to get back into Russia, but no option previously available to him proved successful. Within months, Lenin led the October Revolution, in which the Bolsheviks seized power from the moderates and withdrew Russia from the world war. Leon Trotsky observed that the October Revolution could not have succeeded if Lenin had remained stuck in Switzerland.

Thus, the Imperial German government had an important influence in the creation of what would become the Soviet Union by turning over Russia's socialist transformation decisively into the hands of the Bolsheviks, whereas in February, it had been oriented toward parliamentary democracy.

In early and mid-1918, many people in both Russia and Germany expected that Russia would now "return the favor" by helping to foster a communist revolution on German soil. European communists had long looked forward to a time when Germany, the homeland of Karl Marx and Friedrich Engels, would undergo such a revolution. The success of the Russian proletariat and peasantry in overthrowing their ruling classes raised fears among the German bourgeoisie that such a revolution could take place in Germany as well. Furthermore, the proletarian internationalism of Marx and Engels was still very influential in both Western Europe and Russia at the time, and Marx and Engels had predicted that for a communist revolution to succeed in Russia, there would probably need to be a Western European communist revolution earlier or at least simultaneously. Lenin had high hopes for world revolution in 1917 and 1918. The communism of Marx and Engels had had a sizable following among German workers for decades, and there were quite a few German revolutionaries eager to see revolutionary success in Russia and have help from Russian colleagues in a German revolution.

The moderate SPD leadership noted that a determined and well-managed group of the Bolshevik type might well try to seize power in Germany, quite possibly with Bolshevik help, and they moved their behavior towards the left as the German Revolution approached. Otto Braun clarified the position of his party in a leading article in Vorwärts under the title "The Bolsheviks and Us":

Socialism cannot be erected on bayonets and machine guns. If it is to last, it must be realised with democratic means. Therefore of course it is a necessary prerequisite that the economic and social conditions for socializing society are ripe. If this was the case in Russia, the Bolsheviks no doubt could rely on the majority of the people. As this is not the case, they established a reign of the sword that could not have been more brutal and reckless under the disgraceful regime of the Tzar.... Therefore we must draw a thick, visible dividing line between us and the Bolsheviks.

In the same month in which Otto Braun's article appeared (October 1918), another series of strikes swept through Germany with the participation of over 1 million workers. For the first time during these strikes, the so-called Revolutionary Stewards took action. They were to play an important part in further developments. They called themselves "Councils" (Räte) after the Russian "Soviets". To weaken their influence, Ebert, then the leader of the SPD, joined the Berlin strike leadership and achieved an early termination of the strike.

On 3 March 1918, the newly established Soviet government agreed to the Treaty of Brest-Litovsk negotiated with the Germans by Leon Trotsky. The settlement arguably contained harsher terms for the Russians than the later Treaty of Versailles would demand of the Germans. The Bolsheviks' principal motivation for acceding to so many of Germany's demands was to stay in power at any cost amid the backdrop of the Russian Civil War. Lenin and Trotsky also believed at the time that all of Europe would soon see world revolution, and that bourgeois nationalistic interests as a framework to judge the treaty would become irrelevant.

With Russia omitted from the war, the German Supreme Command could now move part of the eastern armies to the Western Front. Most Germans believed that victory in the west was now at hand.

Request for ceasefire and change of constitution 
After the victory in the east, the Supreme Army Command on 21 March 1918 launched its so-called Spring Offensive in the west to turn the war decisively in Germany's favour, but by July 1918, their last reserves were used up, and Germany's military defeat became certain. The Allied forces scored numerous successive victories in the Hundred Days Offensive between August and November 1918 that yielded huge territorial gains at the expense of Germany. The arrival of large numbers of fresh troops from the United States was a decisive factor.

In mid-September, the Balkan Front collapsed. The Kingdom of Bulgaria, an ally of the German Empire and Austria-Hungary, capitulated on 27 September. The political collapse of Austria-Hungary itself was now only a matter of days away.

On 29 September, the Supreme Army Command, at army headquarters in Spa, Belgium, informed Emperor Wilhelm II and the Imperial Chancellor Count Georg von Hertling that the military situation was hopeless. Ludendorff said that he could not guarantee to hold the front for another 24 hours and demanded a request to the Entente powers for an immediate ceasefire. In addition, he recommended the acceptance of the main demand of Wilson to put the Imperial Government on a democratic footing in hopes of more favourable peace terms. This enabled him to protect the reputation of the Imperial Army and put the responsibility for the capitulation and its consequences squarely at the feet of the democratic parties and the Reichstag.

As he said to his staff officers on 1 October: "They now must lie on the bed that they have made us."

Thus, the so-called "stab-in-the-back legend" was born, according to which the revolutionaries had attacked the undefeated army from the rear and turned an almost-certain victory into a defeat.

In fact, the Imperial Government and the German Army shirked their responsibility for defeat from the very beginning and tried to place the blame for it on the new democratic government. The motivation behind it is verified by the following citation in the autobiography of Wilhelm Groener, Ludendorff's successor:

It was just fine with me when Army and Army Command remained as guiltless as possible in these wretched truce negotiations, from which nothing good could be expected.

In nationalist circles, the myth fell on fertile ground. The nationalists soon defamed the revolutionaries (and even politicians like Ebert who never wanted a revolution and did everything to prevent it) as "November Criminals". When Adolf Hitler planned his attempted coup d'état of 1923 in collaboration with Ludendorff, the heavily symbolic date of 9 November (the anniversary of the proclamation of the republic he was trying to overthrow) was chosen for its launch.

Although shocked by Ludendorff's report and the news of the defeat, the majority parties in the Reichstag, especially the SPD, were willing to take on the responsibility of government at the eleventh hour. As a convinced royalist, Hertling objected to handing over the reins to the Reichstag, thus Emperor Wilhelm II appointed Prince Maximilian of Baden as the new Imperial Chancellor on 3 October. The prince was considered a liberal, but at the same time a representative of the royal family. In his cabinet, Social Democrats dominated. The most prominent and highest-ranking one was Philipp Scheidemann, as under-secretary without portfolio. The following day, the new government offered to the Allies the truce that Ludendorff had demanded.

It was only on 5 October that the German public was informed of the dismal situation that it faced. In the general state of shock about the defeat, which now had become obvious, the constitutional changes, formally decided by the Reichstag on 28 October, went almost unnoticed. From then on, the Imperial Chancellor and his ministers depended on the confidence of the parliamentary majority. After the Supreme Command had passed from the emperor to the Imperial Government, the German Empire changed from a constitutional to a parliamentary monarchy. As far as the Social Democrats were concerned, the so-called October Constitution met all the important constitutional objectives of the party. Ebert already regarded 5 October as the birthday of German democracy since the emperor voluntarily ceded power and so he considered a revolution unnecessary.

Third Wilson note and Ludendorff's dismissal 
In the following three weeks, American President Woodrow Wilson responded to the request for a truce with three diplomatic notes. As a precondition for negotiations, he demanded the retreat of Germany from all occupied territories, the cessation of submarine activities and (implicitly) the emperor's abdication. This last demand was intended to render the process of democratisation irreversible.

After the third note of 24 October, General Ludendorff changed his mind and declared the conditions of the Allies to be unacceptable. He now demanded the resumption of the war that he had declared lost only one month earlier. While the request for a truce was being processed, the Allies came to realise Germany's military weakness. The German troops had come to expect the war to end and were anxious to return home. They were scarcely willing to fight more battles, and desertions were increasing.

For the time being, the Imperial government stayed on course and replaced Ludendorff as First General Quartermaster with General Groener. Ludendorff fled with false papers to neutral Sweden. On 5 November, the Entente Powers agreed to take up negotiations for a truce, but after the third note, many soldiers and the general population believed that the emperor had to abdicate to achieve peace.

Revolution

Sailors' revolt 

While the war-weary troops and general population of Germany awaited the speedy end of the war, the Imperial Naval Command in Kiel under Admiral Franz von Hipper and Admiral Reinhard Scheer planned to dispatch the Imperial Fleet for a last battle against the Royal Navy in the southern North Sea. The two admirals sought to lead this military action on their own initiative, without authorization.

The naval order of 24 October 1918 and the preparations to sail triggered a mutiny among the affected sailors. The revolt soon precipitated a general revolution in Germany that would sweep aside the monarchy within a few days. The mutinous sailors had no intention of risking their lives so close to the end of the war. They were also convinced that the credibility of the new democratic government, engaged as it was in seeking an armistice with the victorious Entente, would have been compromised by a naval attack at such a crucial point in negotiations.

The sailors' revolt started in the Schillig Roads off Wilhelmshaven, where the German fleet had anchored in expectation of battle. During the night of 29–30 October 1918, some crews refused to obey orders. Sailors on board three ships of the Third Navy Squadron refused to weigh anchor. However, when some torpedo boats directed their guns onto these ships a day later, the mutineers gave up and were led away without any resistance. Nonetheless, the Naval Command had to drop its plans for a naval engagement with British naval forces since it was felt that the loyalty of the crews could not be relied upon any more. The III Battle Squadron was ordered back to Kiel.

The squadron commander Vice-Admiral Kraft carried out a maneuver with his battleships in Heligoland Bight. The maneuver was successful, and he believed that he had regained control of his crews. In Holtenau (the end of the canal in Kiel), they were taken to the Arrestanstalt (military prison) in Kiel and to Fort Herwarth in the north of Kiel.

The sailors and stokers were now pulling out all the stops to prevent the fleet setting sail again and to achieve the release of their comrades. Some 250 met in the evening of 1 November in the Union House in Kiel. Delegations sent to their officers requesting the mutineers' release were not heard. The sailors were now looking for closer ties to the unions, the USPD and the SPD. Then, the Union House was closed by police, leading to an even larger joint open air meeting on 2 November. Led by the sailor Karl Artelt, who worked in the torpedo workshop in Kiel-Friedrichsort, and by the mobilised shipyard worker Lothar Popp, both USPD members, the sailors called for a mass meeting the following day at the same place: the Großer Exerzierplatz (large drill ground).

This call was heeded by several thousand people on the afternoon of 3 November, with workers' representatives also present. The slogan "Peace and Bread" (Frieden und Brot) was raised, showing that the sailors and workers demanded not only the release of the prisoners but also the end of the war and the improvement of food provisions. Eventually, the people supported Artelt's call to free the prisoners, and they moved towards the military prison. Sub-Lieutenant Steinhäuser, in order to stop the demonstrators, ordered his patrol to fire warning shots and then to shoot directly into the demonstration; 7 people were killed and 29 severely injured. Some demonstrators also opened fire. Steinhäuser himself was seriously injured by rifle-butt blows and shots, but contrary to later statements, he was not killed. After this eruption, the demonstrators and the patrol dispersed. Nevertheless, the mass protest turned into a general revolt.

On the morning of 4 November, groups of mutineers moved through the town of Kiel. Sailors in a large barracks compound in a northern district mutinied: after a divisional inspection by the commander, spontaneous demonstrations took place. Karl Artelt organised the first soldiers' council and soon many more were set up. The governor of the naval station, Wilhelm Souchon, was compelled to negotiate.

The imprisoned sailors and stokers were freed, and soldiers and workers brought public and military institutions under their control. In breach of Souchon's promise, separate troops advanced to end the rebellion but were intercepted by the mutineers and sent back or decided to join the sailors and workers. By the evening of 4 November, Kiel was firmly in the hands of about 40,000 rebellious sailors, soldiers and workers, as was Wilhelmshaven two days later.

On the same evening, the SPD deputy Gustav Noske arrived in Kiel and was welcomed enthusiastically, but he had orders from the new government and the SPD leadership to bring the uprising under control. He had himself elected chairman of the soldiers' council and reinstated peace and order. Some days later he took over the governor's post, and Lothar Popp of the USPD became chairman of the overall soldiers' council.

During the following weeks, Noske succeeded in reducing the influence of the councils in Kiel, but he could not prevent the spread of the revolution throughout Germany. The events had already spread far beyond Kiel.

Spread of revolution to the entire German Empire 
Around 4 November, delegations of the sailors dispersed to all of the major cities in Germany. By 7 November, the revolution had seized all large coastal cities as well as Hanover, Brunswick, Frankfurt on Main, and Munich. In Munich, a "Workers' and Soldiers' Council" forced the last King of Bavaria, Ludwig III, to issue the Anif declaration. Bavaria was the first member state of the German Empire to be declared a Volksstaat, the People's State of Bavaria, by Kurt Eisner of the USPD who asserted that Ludwig III had abdicated his throne via the Anif declaration. In the following days, the dynastic rulers of all the other German states abdicated; by the end of the month, all 22 German monarchs had been dethroned.

The Workers' and Soldiers' Councils were almost entirely made up of MSPD and USPD members. Their program was democracy, pacifism and anti-militarism. Apart from the dynastic families, they deprived only the military commands of their power and privilege. The duties of the imperial civilian administration and office bearers such as police, municipal administrations and courts were not curtailed or interfered with. There were hardly any confiscations of property or occupation of factories, because such measures were expected from the new government. In order to create an executive committed to the revolution and to the future of the new government, the councils for the moment claimed only to take over the supervision of the administration from the military commands.

Thus, the MSPD was able to establish a firm base on the local level. But while the councils believed they were acting in the interest of the new order, the party leaders of the MSPD regarded them as disturbing elements for a peaceful changeover of power that they imagined already to have taken place. Along with the middle-class parties, they demanded speedy elections for a national assembly that would make the final decision on the constitution of the new state. This soon brought the MSPD into opposition with many of the revolutionaries. It was especially the USPD that took over their demands, one of which was to delay elections as long as possible to try to achieve a fait accompli that met the expectations of a large part of the workforce.

Notably, revolutionary sentiment did not affect the eastern lands of the Empire to any considerable extent, apart from isolated instances of agitation in Breslau and Königsberg. Interethnic discontent among Germans and minority Poles in the eastern extremities of Silesia, long suppressed in Wilhelmine Germany, would eventually lead to the Silesian Uprisings.

Reactions in Berlin 
Ebert agreed with Prince Maximilian that a social revolution must be prevented and that state order must be upheld at all costs. In the restructuring of the state, Ebert wanted to win over the middle-class parties that had already cooperated with the SPD in the Reichstag in 1917, as well as the old elites of the German Empire. He wanted to avoid the spectre of radicalisation of the revolution along Russian lines and he also worried that the precarious supply situation could collapse, leading to the takeover of the administration by inexperienced revolutionaries. He was certain that the SPD would be able to implement its reform plans in the future due to its parliamentary majorities.

Ebert did his best to act in agreement with the old powers and intended to save the monarchy. In order to demonstrate some success to his followers, he demanded the abdication of the emperor as of 6 November. But Wilhelm II, still in his headquarters in Spa, was playing for time. After the Entente had agreed to truce negotiations on that day, he hoped to return to Germany at the head of the army and to quell the revolution by force.

According to notes taken by Prince Maximilian, Ebert declared on 7 November, "If the Kaiser does not abdicate, the social revolution is unavoidable. But I do not want it, indeed I hate it like sin." The chancellor planned to travel to Spa and convince the emperor personally of the necessity to abdicate. But this plan was overtaken by the rapidly deteriorating situation in Berlin.

Saturday, 9 November 1918: two proclamations of a republic

In order to remain master of the situation, Friedrich Ebert demanded the chancellorship for himself on the afternoon of 9 November, the day of the emperor's abdication.

The news of the abdication came too late to make any impression on the demonstrators. Nobody heeded the public appeals. More and more demonstrators demanded the total abolition of the monarchy. Karl Liebknecht, just released from prison, had returned to Berlin and re-founded the Spartacist League the previous day. At lunch in the Reichstag, the SPD deputy chairman Philipp Scheidemann learned that Liebknecht planned the proclamation of a socialist republic. Scheidemann did not want to leave the initiative to the Spartacists and without further ado, he stepped out onto a balcony of the Reichstag. From there, he proclaimed a republic before a mass of demonstrating people on his own authority (against Ebert's expressed will). A few hours later, the Berlin newspapers reported that in the Berlin Lustgarten – at probably around the same time – Liebknecht had proclaimed a socialist republic, which he affirmed from a balcony of the Berlin City Palace to an assembled crowd at around 4 pm.

At that time, Karl Liebknecht's intentions were little known to the public. The Spartacist League's demands of 7 October for a far-reaching restructuring of the economy, the army and the judiciary – among other things by abolishing the death penalty – had not yet been publicised. The biggest bone of contention with the SPD was to be the Spartacists' demand for the establishment of "unalterable political facts" on the ground by social and other measures before the election of a constituent assembly, while the SPD wanted to leave the decision on the future economic system to the assembly.

Ebert was faced with a dilemma. The first proclamation he had issued on 9 November was addressed "to the citizens of Germany".

Ebert wanted to take the sting out of the revolutionary mood and to meet the demands of the demonstrators for the unity of the labour parties. He offered the USPD participation in the government and was ready to accept Liebknecht as a minister. Liebknecht in turn demanded the control of the workers' councils over the army. As USPD chairman Hugo Haase was in Kiel and the deliberations went on. The USPD deputies were unable to reach a decision that day.

Neither the early announcement of the emperor's abdication, Ebert's assumption of the chancellorship, nor Scheidemann's proclamation of the republic were covered by the constitution. These were all revolutionary actions by protagonists who did not want a revolution, but nevertheless took action. However, a real revolutionary action took place the same evening that would later prove to have been in vain.

Around 8 pm, a group of 100 Revolutionary Stewards from the larger Berlin factories occupied the Reichstag. Led by their spokesmen Richard Müller and Emil Barth, they formed a revolutionary parliament. Most of the participating stewards had already been leaders during the strikes earlier in the year. They did not trust the SPD leadership and had planned a coup for 11 November independently of the sailors' revolt, but were surprised by the revolutionary events since Kiel. In order to snatch the initiative from Ebert, they now decided to announce elections for the following day. On that Sunday, every Berlin factory and every regiment was to elect workers' and soldiers' councils that were then in turn to elect a revolutionary government from members of the two labour parties (SPD and USPD). This Council of the People's Deputies (Rat der Volksbeauftragten) was to execute the resolutions of the revolutionary parliament as the revolutionaries intended to replace Ebert's function as chancellor and president.

Sunday, 10 November: revolutionary councils elected, Armistice

The same evening, the SPD leadership heard of these plans. As the elections and the councils' meeting could not be prevented, Ebert sent speakers to all Berlin regiments and into the factories in the same night and early the following morning. They were to influence the elections in his favour and announce the intended participation of the USPD in the government.

In turn, these activities did not escape the attention of Richard Müller and the revolutionary shop stewards. Seeing that Ebert would also be running the new government, they planned to propose to the assembly not only the election of a government, but also the appointment of an Action Committee. This committee was to co-ordinate the activities of the Workers' and Soldiers' Councils. For this election, the Stewards had already prepared a list of names on which the SPD was not represented. In this manner, they hoped to install a monitoring body acceptable to them watching the government.

In the assembly that convened on 10 November in the Circus Busch, the majority stood on the side of the SPD: almost all Soldiers' Councils and a large part of the workers representatives. They repeated the demand for the "Unity of the Working Class" that had been put forward by the revolutionaries the previous day and now used this motto in order to push through Ebert's line. As planned, three members of each socialist party were elected into the "Council of People's Representatives": from the USPD, their chairman Hugo Haase, the deputy Wilhelm Dittmann and Emil Barth for the Revolutionary Stewards; from the SPD Ebert, Scheidemann and the Magdeburg deputy Otto Landsberg.

The proposal by the shop stewards to elect an action committee additionally took the SPD leadership by surprise and started heated debates. Ebert finally succeeded in having this 24-member "Executive Council of Workers' and Soldiers' Councils" equally filled with SPD and USPD members. The Executive Council was chaired by Richard Müller and Brutus Molkenbuhr.

On the evening of 10 November, there was a phone call between Ebert and General Wilhelm Groener, the new First General Quartermaster in Spa, Belgium. Assuring Ebert of the support of the army, the general was given Ebert's promise to reinstate the military hierarchy and, with the help of the army, to take action against the councils.

In the turmoil of this day, the Ebert government's acceptance of the harsh terms of the Entente for a truce, after a renewed demand by the Supreme Command, went almost unnoticed. On 11 November, the Centre Party deputy Matthias Erzberger, on behalf of Berlin, signed the armistice agreement in Compiègne, France, and World War I came to an end.

Double rule 
Although Ebert had saved the decisive role of the SPD, he was not happy with the results. He did not regard the Council Parliament and the Executive Council as helpful, but only as obstacles impeding a smooth transition from empire to a new system of government. The whole SPD leadership mistrusted the councils rather than the old elites in army and administration, and they considerably overestimated the old elite's loyalty to the new republic. What troubled Ebert most was that he could not now act as chancellor in front of the councils, but only as chairman of a revolutionary government. Though he had taken the lead of the revolution only to halt it, conservatives saw him as a traitor.

In theory, the Executive Council was the highest-ranking council of the revolutionary regime and therefore Müller the head of state of the new declared "Socialist Republic of Germany". But in practice, the council's initiative was blocked by internal power struggles. The Executive Council decided to summon an "Reich Council Convention" in December to Berlin. In the eight weeks of double rule of councils and Reich government, the latter always was dominant. Although Haase was formally a chairman in the council with equal rights, the whole higher level administration reported only to Ebert.

The SPD worried that the revolution would end in a Council (Soviet) Republic, following the Russian example. However, the secret Ebert-Groener pact did not win over the Officer Corps for the republic. As Ebert's behaviour became increasingly puzzling to the revolutionary workers, the soldiers and their stewards, the SPD leadership lost more and more of their supporters' confidence, without gaining any sympathies from the opponents of the revolution on the right.

Stinnes–Legien Agreement 

The revolutionaries disagreed among themselves about the future economic and political system. Both SPD and USPD favoured placing at least heavy industry under democratic control. The left wings of both parties and the Revolutionary Stewards wanted to go beyond that and establish a "direct democracy" in the production sector, with elected delegates controlling the political power. It was not only in the interest of the SPD to prevent a Council Democracy; even the unions would have been rendered superfluous by the councils.

To prevent this development, the union leaders under Carl Legien and the representatives of big industry under Hugo Stinnes and Carl Friedrich von Siemens met in Berlin from 9 to 12 November. On 15 November, they signed an agreement with advantages for both sides: the union representatives promised to guarantee orderly production, to end wildcat strikes, to drive back the influence of the councils and to prevent a nationalisation of means of production. For their part, the employers guaranteed to introduce the eight-hour day, which the workers had demanded in vain for years. The employers agreed to the union claim of sole representation and to the lasting recognition of the unions instead of the councils. Both parties formed a "Central Committee for the Maintenance of the Economy" (Zentralausschuss für die Aufrechterhaltung der Wirtschaft).

An "Arbitration Committee" (Schlichtungsausschuss) was to mediate future conflicts between employers and unions. From now on, committees together with the management were to monitor the wage settlements in every factory with more than 50 employees.

With this arrangement, the unions had achieved one of their longtime demands, but undermined all efforts for nationalising means of production and largely eliminated the councils.

Interim government and council movement 
The Reichstag had not been summoned since 9 November. The Council of the People's Deputies and the Executive Council had replaced the old government, but the previous administrative machinery remained unchanged. Civil servants from the imperial era had only representatives of SPD and USPD assigned to them. These civil servants all kept their positions and continued to do their work in most respects unchanged.

On 12 November, the Council of People's Representatives published its democratic and social government programme. It lifted the state of siege and censorship, abolished the "Gesindeordnung" ("servant rules" that governed relations between servant and master) and introduced universal suffrage from 20 years up, for the first time for women. There was an amnesty for all political prisoners. Regulations for the freedom of association, assembly and press were enacted. The eight-hour day became statutory on the basis of the Stinnes–Legien Agreement, and benefits for unemployment, social insurance, and workers' compensation were expanded.

At the insistence of USPD representatives, the Council of People's Representatives appointed a "Nationalisation Committee" including Karl Kautsky, Rudolf Hilferding and Otto Hue, among others. This committee was to examine which industries were "fit" for nationalisation and to prepare the nationalisation of the coal and steel industry. It sat until 7 April 1919, without any tangible result. "Self-Administration Bodies" were installed only in coal and potash mining and in the steel industry. From these bodies emerged the modern German Works or Factory Committees. Socialist expropriations were not initiated.

The SPD leadership worked with the old administration rather than with the new Workers' and Soldiers' Councils, because it considered them incapable of properly supplying the needs of the population. As of mid-November, this caused continuing strife with the Executive Council. As the Council continuously changed its position following whoever it just happened to represent, Ebert withdrew more and more responsibilities planning to end the "meddling and interfering" of the Councils in Germany for good. But Ebert and the SPD leadership by far overestimated the power not only of the Council Movement but also of the Spartacist League. The Spartacist League, for example, never had control over the Council Movement as the conservatives and parts of the SPD believed.

In Leipzig, Hamburg, Bremen, Chemnitz, and Gotha, the Workers' and Soldiers' Councils took the city administrations under their control. In addition, in Brunswick, Düsseldorf, Mülheim/Ruhr, and Zwickau, all civil servants loyal to the emperor were arrested. In Hamburg and Bremen, "Red Guards" were formed that were to protect the revolution. The councils deposed the management of the Leuna works, a giant chemical factory near Merseburg. The new councils were often appointed spontaneously and arbitrarily and had no management experience whatsoever. But a majority of councils came to arrangements with the old administrations and saw to it that law and order were quickly restored. For example, Max Weber was part of the workers' council of Heidelberg, and was pleasantly surprised that most members were moderate German liberals. The councils took over the distribution of food, the police force, and the accommodation and provisions of the front-line soldiers that were gradually returning home.

Former imperial administrators and the councils depended on each other: the former had the knowledge and experience, the latter had political clout. In most cases, SPD members had been elected into the councils who regarded their job as an interim solution. For them, as well as for the majority of the German population in 1918–19, the introduction of a Council Republic was never an issue, but they were not even given a chance to think about it. Many wanted to support the new government and expected it to abolish militarism and the authoritarian state. Being weary of the war and hoping for a peaceful solution, they partially overestimated the revolutionary achievements.

General Council Convention 
As decided by the executive committee, the Workers' and Soldiers' Councils in the whole empire sent deputies to Berlin, who were to convene on 16 December in the Circus Busch for the "First General Convention of Workers' and Soldiers' Councils" (Erster Allgemeiner Kongress der Arbeiter- und Soldatenräte). On 15 December, Ebert and General Groener had troops ordered to Berlin to prevent this convention and to regain control of the capital. On 16 December, one of the regiments intended for this plan advanced too early. In an attempt to arrest the Executive Council, the soldiers opened fire on a demonstration of unarmed "Red Guards", representatives of Soldiers' Councils affiliated with the Spartacists; 16 people were killed.

With this, the potential for violence and the danger of a coup from the right became visible. In response to the incident, Rosa Luxemburg demanded the peaceful disarmament of the homecoming military units by the Berlin workforce in the daily newspaper of the Spartacist League Red Flag (Rote Fahne) of 12 December. She wanted the Soldiers' Councils to be subordinated to the Revolutionary Parliament and the soldiers to become "re-educated".

On 10 December, Ebert welcomed ten divisions returning from the front hoping to use them against the councils. As it turned out, these troops also were not willing to go on fighting. The war was over, Christmas was at the door and most of the soldiers just wanted to go home to their families. Shortly after their arrival in Berlin, they dispersed. The blow against the Convention of Councils did not take place.

This blow would have been unnecessary anyway, because the convention that took up its work 16 December in the Prussian House of Representatives consisted mainly of SPD followers. Not even Karl Liebknecht had managed to get a seat. The Spartacist League was not granted any influence. On 19 December, the councils voted 344 to 98 against the creation of a council system as a basis for a new constitution. Instead, they supported the government's decision to call for elections for a constituent national assembly as soon as possible. This assembly was to decide upon the state system.

The convention disagreed with Ebert only on the issue of control of the army. The convention was demanding a say for the Central Council that it would elect, in the supreme command of the army, the free election of officers and the disciplinary powers for the Soldiers' Councils. That would have been contrary to the agreement between Ebert and General Groener. They both spared no effort to undo this decision. The Supreme Command (which in the meantime had moved from Spa to Kassel), began to raise loyal volunteer corps (the Freikorps) against the supposed Bolshevik menace. Unlike the revolutionary soldiers of November, these troops were monarchist-minded officers and men who feared the return into civil life.

Christmas crisis of 1918 

After 9 November, the government ordered the newly created People's Navy Division (Volksmarinedivision) from Kiel to Berlin for its protection and stationed it in the Royal Stables (Neuer Marstell) across from the Berlin City Palace (Berlin Schloss or Berlin Stadtschloss). The division was considered absolutely loyal and had indeed refused to participate in the coup attempt of 6 December. The sailors even deposed their commander because they saw him as involved in the affair. It was this loyalty that now gave them the reputation of being in favor of the Spartacists. Ebert demanded their disbanding and Otto Wels, as of 9 November the Commander of Berlin and in line with Ebert, refused the sailors' pay.

The dispute escalated on 23 December. After having been put off for days, the sailors occupied the Reich Chancellery itself, cut the phone lines, put the Council of People's Representatives under house arrest and captured Otto Wels. The sailors did not exploit the situation to eliminate the Ebert government, as would have been expected from Spartacist revolutionaries. Instead, they just insisted on their pay. Nevertheless, Ebert, who was in touch with the Supreme Command in Kassel via a secret phone line, gave orders to attack the Residence with troops loyal to the government on the morning of 24 December. The sailors repelled the attack under their commander Heinrich Dorrenbach, losing about 30 men and civilians in the fight. The government troops had to withdraw from the center of Berlin. They themselves were now disbanded and integrated into the newly formed Freikorps. To make up for their humiliating withdrawal, they temporarily occupied the editor's offices of the Red Flag. But military power in Berlin once more was in the hands of the People's Navy Division. Again, the sailors did not take advantage of the situation.

On one side, this restraint demonstrates that the sailors were not Spartacists, on the other that the revolution had no guidance. Even if Liebknecht had been a revolutionary leader like Lenin, to which legend later made him, the sailors as well as the councils would not have accepted him as such. Thus the only result of the Christmas Crisis, which the Spartacists named "Ebert's Bloody Christmas", was that the Revolutionary Stewards called for a demonstration on Christmas Day and the USPD left the government in protest on 29 December. They could not have done Ebert a bigger favor, since he had let them participate only under the pressure of revolutionary events. Within a few days, the military defeat of the Ebert government had turned into a political victory.

Founding of the Communist Party and the January Revolt of 1919 

After their experiences with the SPD and the USPD, the Spartacists concluded that their goals could be met only by forming a party of their own, thus they joined with other left-socialist groups from the whole of Germany to found the Communist Party of Germany (KPD).

Rosa Luxemburg drew up her founding programme and presented it on 31 December 1918. In this programme, she pointed out that the communists could never take power without the clear will of the people in the majority. On 1 January, she demanded that the KPD participate in the planned nationwide German elections, but was outvoted. The majority still hoped to gain power by continued agitation in the factories and from "pressure from the streets". After deliberations with the Spartacists, the Revolutionary Stewards decided to remain in the USPD. This was a first defeat.

The decisive defeat of the left occurred in the first days of the new year in 1919. As in the previous November, a second revolutionary wave developed, but in this case, it was violently suppressed. The wave was started on 4 January, when the government dismissed the chief constable of Berlin, Emil Eichhorn. The latter was a member of the USPD who had refused to act against the demonstrating workers in the Christmas Crisis. This action resulted in the USPD, Revolutionary Stewards and the KPD chairmen Karl Liebknecht and Wilhelm Pieck to call for a demonstration to take place on the following day.

To the surprise of the initiators, the demonstration turned into an assembly of huge masses. On Sunday, 5 January, as on 9 November 1918, hundreds of thousands of people poured into the centre of Berlin, many of them armed. In the afternoon, the train stations and the newspaper district with the offices of the middle-class press and Vorwärts were occupied. Some of the middle-class papers in the previous days had called not only for the raising of more Freikorps, but also for the murder of the Spartacists.

The demonstrators were mainly the same ones who participated in the disturbances two months previously. They now demanded the fulfillment of the hopes expressed in November. The Spartacists by no means had a leading position. The demands came straight from the workforce supported by various groups left of the SPD. The so-called "Spartacist Uprising" that followed originated only partially in the KPD. KPD members were even a minority among the insurgents.

The initiators assembled at the Police Headquarters elected a 53-member "Interim Revolutionary Committee" (Provisorischer Revolutionsausschuss) that failed to make use of its power and was unable to give any clear direction. Liebknecht demanded the overthrow of the government and agreed with the majority of the committee that propagated the armed struggle. Rosa Luxemburg as well as the majority of KPD leaders thought a revolt at this moment to be a catastrophe and spoke out against it.

On the following day, 6 January, the Revolutionary Committee again called for a mass demonstration. This time, even more people heeded the call. Again they carried placards and banners that proclaimed, "Brothers, don't shoot!" and remained waiting on an assembly square. A part of the Revolutionary Stewards armed themselves and called for the overthrow of the Ebert government. But the KPD activists mostly failed in their endeavour to win over the troops. It turned out that even units such as the People's Navy Division were not willing to support the armed revolt and declared themselves neutral. The other regiments stationed in Berlin mostly remained loyal to the government.

While more troops were moving into Berlin on Ebert's order, he accepted an offer by the USPD to mediate between him and the Revolutionary Committee. After the advance of the troops into the city became known, an SPD leaflet appeared saying, "The hour of reckoning is nigh". With this, the Committee broke off further negotiations on 8 January. That was opportunity enough for Ebert to use the troops stationed in Berlin against the occupiers. Beginning 9 January, they violently quelled an improvised revolt. In addition to that, on 12 January, the anti-republican Freikorps, which had been raised more or less as death squads since the beginning of December, moved into Berlin. Gustav Noske, who had been People's Representative for Army and Navy for a few days, accepted the premium command of these troops by saying, "If you like, someone has to be the bloodhound. I won't shy away from the responsibility."

The Freikorps brutally cleared several buildings and executed the occupiers on the spot. Others soon surrendered, but some of them were still shot. The January revolt claimed 156 lives in Berlin.

Murder of Karl Liebknecht and Rosa Luxemburg 
The alleged ringleaders of the January Revolt had to go into hiding. In spite of the urgings of their allies, they refused to leave Berlin. On the evening of 15 January 1919, Rosa Luxemburg and Karl Liebknecht were discovered in an apartment of the Wilmersdorf district of Berlin. They were immediately arrested and handed over to the largest Freikorps, the heavily armed Garde-Kavallerie-Schützen-Division. Their commander, Captain Waldemar Pabst, had them questioned. That same night both prisoners were beaten unconscious with rifle butts and shot in the head. Rosa Luxemburg's body was thrown into the Landwehr Canal that ran through Berlin, where it was found only on 1 July. Karl Liebknecht's body, without a name, was delivered to a morgue.

The perpetrators for the most part went unpunished. The Nazi Party later compensated the few that had been tried or even jailed, and they merged the Gardekavallerie into the SA (Sturmabteilung). In an interview given to "Der Spiegel" in 1962 and in his memoirs, Pabst maintained that he had talked on the phone with Noske in the Chancellery, and that Noske and Ebert had approved of his actions. Pabst's statement was never confirmed, especially since neither the Reichstag nor the courts ever examined the case.

After the murders of 15 January, the political differences between the SPD and KPD grew even more irreconcilable. In the following years, both parties were unable to agree on joint action against the Nazi Party, which dramatically grew in strength as of 1930.

Further revolts in tow of the revolution 

In the first months of 1919, there were further armed revolts all over Germany. In some states, Councils Republics were proclaimed, most prominently in Bavaria (the Munich Soviet Republic), even if only temporarily.

These revolts were triggered by Noske's decision at the end of February to take armed action against the Bremen Soviet Republic. In spite of an offer to negotiate, he ordered his Freikorps units to invade the city. Approximately 400 people were killed in the ensuing fights.

This caused an eruption of mass strikes in the Ruhr District, the Rhineland and in Saxony. Members of the USPD, the KPD and even the SPD called for a general strike that started on 4 March. Against the will of the strike leadership, the strikes escalated into street fighting in Berlin. The Prussian state government, which in the meantime had declared a state of siege, called on the Reich government for help. Again Noske employed the Gardekavallerie-Schützendivision, commanded by Pabst, against the strikers in Berlin. By the end of the fighting on 16 March, they had killed approximately 1,200 people, many of them unarmed and uninvolved. Among others, 29 members of the Peoples Navy Division, who had surrendered, were summarily executed, since Noske had ordered that anybody found armed should be shot on the spot.

The situation in Hamburg and Thuringia also was very much like a civil war. The council government to hold out the longest was the Munich Soviet Republic. It was only on 2 May that Prussian and Freikorps units from Württemberg toppled it by using the same violent methods as in Berlin and Bremen.

According to the predominant opinion of modern historians, the establishment of a Bolshevik-style council government in Germany on 9–10 November 1918 was impossible. Yet the Ebert government felt threatened by a coup from the left, and was certainly undermined by the Spartakus movement; thus it co-operated with the Supreme Command and the Freikorps. The brutal actions of the Freikorps during the various revolts estranged many left democrats from the SPD. They regarded the behavior of Ebert, Noske and the other SPD leaders during the revolution as an outright betrayal of their own followers.

National Assembly and new Reich constitution 

On 19 January 1919, a Constituent National Assembly was elected. Aside from SPD and USPD, the Catholic Centre Party took part, and so did several middle-class parties that had established themselves since November: the left-liberal German Democratic Party (DDP), the national-liberal German People's Party (DVP) and the conservative, nationalist German National People's Party (DNVP). In spite of Rosa Luxemburg's recommendation, the KPD did not participate in these elections.

With 37.4% of the vote, the SPD became the strongest party in the National Assembly and secured 165 out of 423 deputies. The USPD received only 7.6% of the vote and sent 22 deputies into the parliament. The popularity of the USPD temporarily rose one more time after the Kapp-Lüttwitz Putsch in 1920, but the party dissolved in 1922. The Centre Party was runner-up to the SPD with 91 deputies, the DDP had 75, the DVP 19 and the DNVP 44. As a result of the elections, the SPD formed the so-called Weimar Coalition with the Centre Party and the DDP. To get away from the post-revolutionary confusion in Berlin, the National Assembly met on 6 February in the town of Weimar, Thuringia, some 250 km to the southwest of Berlin, where Friedrich Ebert was elected temporary Reich President on 11 February. Philipp Scheidemann was elected as Prime Minister (Ministerpräsident) of the newly formed coalition on 13 February. Ebert was then constitutionally sworn in as Reich President (Reichspräsident) on 21 August 1919.

On the one hand, the Weimar Constitution offered more possibilities for a direct democracy than the present Basic Law for the Federal Republic of Germany, for example by setting up a mechanism for referendums. On the other hand, Article 48 granted the president the authority to rule against the majority in the Reichstag, with the help of the army if need be. In 1932–33, Article 48 was instrumental in destroying German democracy.

Aftermath 

From 1920 to 1923, nationalist forces continued fighting against the Weimar Republic and left-wing political opponents. In 1920, the German government was briefly overthrown in a coup organized by Wolfgang Kapp (the Kapp Putsch), and a nationalist government was briefly in power. Mass public demonstrations soon forced this regime out of power. In 1921 and 1922, Matthias Erzberger and Walter Rathenau were shot by members of the ultra-nationalist Organisation Consul. The newly formed Nazi Party, under the leadership of Adolf Hitler and supported by former German army chief Erich Ludendorff, engaged in political violence against the government and left-wing political forces as well. In 1923, in what is now known as the Beer Hall Putsch, the Nazis took control of parts of Munich, arrested the president of Bavaria, the chief of police, and others and forced them to sign an agreement in which they endorsed the Nazi takeover and its objective to overthrow the German government. The putsch came to an end when the German army and police were called in to put it down, resulting in an armed confrontation in which a number of Nazis and some police were killed.

The Weimar Republic was always under great pressure from both left-wing and right-wing extremists. The left-wing extremists accused the ruling Social Democrats of having betrayed the ideals of the workers' movement by preventing a communist revolution and unleashing the Freikorps upon the workers. Right-wing extremists were opposed to any democratic system, preferring instead an authoritarian state similar to the Empire founded in 1871. To further undermine the Republic's credibility, right-wing extremists (especially certain members of the former officer corps) used the Dolchstoßlegende to blame an alleged conspiracy of Socialists and Jews for Germany's defeat in World War I, largely drawing fuel from the fact that eight out of the ten leaders of the communist revolution were Jewish. Both sides were determined to bring down the Weimar Republic. In the end, the right-wing extremists were successful, and the Weimar Republic came to an end with the ascent of Hitler and the National Socialist Party.

Impact on Weimar Republic 
The Revolution of 1918/19 is one of the most important events in the modern history of Germany, yet it is poorly embedded in the historical memory of Germans. The failure of the Weimar Republic that this revolution brought into being and the Nazi era that followed it obstructed the view of these events for a long time. To this very day, the interpretation of these events has been determined more by legends than by facts.

Both the radical right and the radical leftunder different circumstancesnurtured the idea that a Communist uprising was aiming to establish a Soviet Republic following the Russian example. The democratic centre parties, especially the SPD, were also barely interested in assessing the events which turned Germany into a Republic fairly. At closer look, these events turned out to be a revolution supported by the Social Democrats and stopped by their party leadership. These processes helped to weaken the Weimar Republic from its very beginning.

After the Reich government and the Supreme Command shirked their responsibilities for the war and the defeat at an early stage, the majority parties of the Reichstag were left to cope with the resulting burdens. In his autobiography, Ludendorff's successor Groener states, "It suited me just fine, when the army and the Supreme Command remained as guiltless as possible in these wretched truce negotiations, from which nothing good could be expected".

Thus, the "Myth of the Stab in the Back" was born, according to which the revolutionaries stabbed the army, "undefeated on the field", in the back and only then turned the almost secure victory into a defeat. It was mainly Ludendorff who contributed to the spread of this falsification of history to conceal his own role in the defeat. In nationalistic and national minded circles, the myth fell on fertile ground. They soon defamed the revolutionaries and even politicians like Ebert, who never wanted the revolution and had done everything to channel and contain it, as "November Criminals" (Novemberverbrecher). In 1923, Hitler and Ludendorff deliberately chose symbolic 9 November as the date of their attempted "Beer Hall Putsch".

From its very beginning, the Weimar Republic was afflicted with the stigma of the military defeat. A large part of the bourgeoisie and the old elites from big industry, landowners, military, judiciary and administration never accepted the democratic republic and hoped to get rid of it at the first opportunity. On the left, the actions of the SPD Leadership during the revolution drove many of its former adherents to the Communists. The contained revolution gave birth to a "democracy without democrats".

Contemporary statements 
Depending on their political standpoint of view, contemporaries had greatly differing opinions about the revolution.

Ernst Troeltsch, a Protestant theologian and philosopher, rather calmly remarked how the majority of Berlin citizens perceived 10 November:
On Sunday morning after a frightful night the morning newspapers gave a clear picture: the Kaiser in Holland, the revolution victorious in most urban centres, the royals in the states abdicating. No man dead for Kaiser and Empire! The continuation of duties ensured and no run on the banks! (...) Trams and subways ran as usual which is a pledge that basic needs are cared for. On all faces it could be read: Wages will continue to be paid.

The liberal publicist Theodor Wolff wrote on the very day of 10 November in the newspaper Berliner Tageblatt, lending himself to far too optimistic illusions, which the SPD leadership also might have had:
Like a sudden storm, the biggest of all revolutions has toppled the imperial regime including everything that belonged to it. It can be called the greatest of all revolutions because never has a more firmly built (...) fortress been taken in this manner at the first attempt. Only one week ago, there was still a military and civil administration so deeply rooted that it seemed to have secured its dominion beyond the change of times. (...) Only yesterday morning, at least in Berlin, all this still existed. Yesterday afternoon it was all gone.

The extreme right had a completely opposite perception. On 10 November, conservative journalist Paul Baecker wrote an article in Deutsche Tageszeitung which already contained essential elements of the Stab-in-the-back myth:
The work fought for by our fathers with their precious blood – dismissed by betrayal in the ranks of our own people! Germany, yesterday still undefeated, left to the mercy of our enemies by men carrying the German name, by felony out of our own ranks broken down in guilt and shame.The German Socialists knew that peace was at hand anyway and that it was only about holding out against the enemy for a few days or weeks in order to wrest bearable conditions from them. In this situation they raised the white flag.This is a sin that can never be forgiven and never will be forgiven. This is treason not only against the monarchy and the army but also against the German people themselves who will have to bear the consequences in centuries of decline and of misery.

In an article on the 10th anniversary of the revolution the publicist Kurt Tucholsky remarked that neither Wolff nor Baecker were right. Nevertheless, Tucholsky accused Ebert and Noske of betrayal, not of the monarchy but of the revolution. Although he wanted to regard it as only a coup d'état, he analysed the actual course of events more clearly than most of his contemporaries. In 1928 he wrote in "November Coup":
The German Revolution of 1918 took place in a hall.
The things taking place were not a revolution. There was no spiritual preparation, no leaders ready in the dark; no revolutionary goals. The mother of this revolution was the soldiers' longing to be home for Christmas. And weariness, disgust and weariness.The possibilities that nevertheless were lying in the streets were betrayed by Ebert and his like. Fritz* Ebert, whom you cannot heighten to a personality by calling him Friedrich opposed the establishment of a republic only until he found there was a post of chairman to be had; comrade Scheidemann è tutti quanti all were would-be senior civil servants. (* Fritz is the colloquial term for Friedrich like Willy – William)
The following possibilities were left out: shattering federal states, division of landed property, revolutionary socialization of industry, reform of administrative and judiciary personnel. A republican constitution in which every sentence rescinds the next one, a revolution talking about well acquired rights of the old regime can be only laughed at.
The German Revolution is still to take place.

Walter Rathenau was of a similar opinion. He called the revolution a "disappointment", a "present by chance", a "product of desperation", a "revolution by mistake". It did not deserve the name because it did "not abolish the actual mistakes" but "degenerated into a degrading clash of interests".

Not a chain was broken by the swelling of spirit and will, but a lock merely rusted through. The chain fell off and the freed stood amazed, helpless, embarrassed and needed to arm against their will. The ones sensing their advantage were the quickest.

The historian and publicist Sebastian Haffner in turn came out against Tucholsky and Rathenau. He lived through the revolution in Berlin as a child and wrote 50 years later in his book about one of the myths related to the events of November 1918 that had taken root especially in the bourgeoisie:

It is often said that a true revolution in Germany in 1918 never took place. All that really happened was a breakdown. It was only the temporary weakness of the police and army in the moment of military defeat which let a mutiny of sailors appear as a revolution.
At first sight, one can see how wrong and blind this is comparing 1918 with 1945. In 1945 there really was a breakdown.Certainly a mutiny of sailors started the revolution in 1918 but it was only a start. What made it extraordinary is that a mere sailors' mutiny triggered an earthquake which shook all of Germany; that the whole home army, the whole urban workforce and in Bavaria a part of the rural population rose up in revolt. This revolt was not just a mutiny anymore, it was a true revolution....As in any revolution, the old order was replaced by the beginnings of a new one. It was not only destructive but also creative....As a revolutionary achievement of masses the German November 1918 does not need to take second place to either the French July 1789 or the Russian March 1917.

Historical research 
During the Nazi regime, works on the Weimar Republic and the German Revolution published abroad and by exiles in the 1930s and 1940s could not be read in Germany. Around 1935, that affected the first published history of the Weimar Republic by Arthur Rosenberg. In his view the political situation at the beginning of the revolution was open: the moderate socialist and democratic-oriented work force indeed had a chance to become the actual social foundation of the republic and to drive back the conservative forces. It failed because of the wrong decisions of the SPD leadership and because of the revolutionary tactics employed by the extreme left wing of the work force.

After 1945 West German historical research on the Weimar Republic concentrated most of all on its decline. In 1951, Theodor Eschenburg mostly ignored the revolutionary beginning of the republic. In 1955, Karl Dietrich Bracher also dealt with the German Revolution from the perspective of the failed republic. Erich Eyck shows how little the revolution after 1945 was regarded as part of German history. His two-volume History of the Weimar Republic gave barely 20 pages to these events. The same can be said for Karl Dietrich Erdmann's contribution to the 8th edition of the Gebhardt Handbook for German History (Gebhardtsches Handbuch zur Deutschen Geschichte), whose viewpoint dominated the interpretation of events related to the German Revolution after 1945. According to Erdmann, 1918/19 was about the choice between "social revolution in line with forces demanding a proletarian dictatorship and parliamentary republic in line with the conservative elements like the German officer corps". As most Social Democrats were forced to join up with the old elites to prevent an imminent council dictatorship, the blame for the failure of the Weimar Republic was to be put on the extreme left, and the events of 1918/19 were successful defensive actions of democracy against Bolshevism.

This interpretation at the height of the Cold War was based on the assumption that the extreme left was comparably strong and a real threat to the democratic development. In this point, West German researchers ironically found themselves in line with Marxist historiography in the German Democratic Republic (GDR), which attributed considerable revolutionary potential most of all to the Spartacists.

While in the postwar years the majority SPD (MSPD) was cleared of its Nazi odium as "November Criminals", GDR historians blamed the SPD for "betrayal of the working class" and the USPD leadership for their incompetence. Their interpretation was mainly based on the 1958 theories of the Central Committee of the Socialist Unity Party of Germany according to which the German Revolution was defined as a "bourgeois-democratic revolution", led in certain aspects by proletarian means and methods. The fact that a revolution by the working class in Germany never happened could be put down to the "subjective factor", especially the absence of a "Marxist-Leninist offensive party". Contrary to the official party line, Rudolf Lindau supported the theory that the German Revolution had a Socialist tendency.

Consistently, the founding of the KPD (Communist Party of Germany) was declared to be the decisive turning point in German history, but in spite of ideological bias, historical research in the GDR expanded detailed knowledge of the German Revolution.

During the 1950s, West German historians focused their research on the final stages of the Weimar Republic. In the 1960s, they shifted to its revolutionary beginnings, realising that the decisions and developments during the revolution were central to the failure of the first German Republic. The workers' and soldiers' councils especially moved into focus, and their previous appearance as a far-left movement had to be revised extensively. Authors like Ulrich Kluge, Eberhard Kolb and Reinhard Rürup argued that in the first weeks of the revolution the social base for a democratic redesign of society was much stronger than previously thought and that the potential of the extreme left was actually weaker than the MSPD's leadership, for example, assumed.

As "Bolshevism" posed no real threat, the scope of action for the Council of the People's Deputies (also supported by the more reform-oriented councils) to democratise the administration, military and society had been relatively large, but the MSPD's leadership did not take that step because it trusted in the loyalty of the old elites and mistrusted the spontaneous mass movements in the first weeks of the revolution. The result was the resignation and radicalisation of the council movement. The theories have been supported by the publications of the minutes of the Council of the People's Deputies. Increasingly, the history of the German Revolution appeared as the history of its gradual reversal.

This new interpretation of the German Revolution gained acceptance in research rather quickly even though older perceptions remained alive. Research concerning the composition of the Worker's and Soldier's Councils which today can be easily verified by sources is undisputed to a large extent, but the interpretation of the revolutionary events based on this research has been already criticised and partially modified since the end of the 1970s. Criticism was aimed at the partially idealised description of the Workers' and Soldiers' Councils which especially was the case in the wake of the German Student Movement of the 1960s (1968). Peter von Oertzen went particularly far in this respect describing a social democracy based on councils as a positive alternative to the bourgeois republic. In comparison, Wolfgang J. Mommsen did not regard the councils as a homogeneous focused movement for democracy but as a heterogeneous group with a multitude of different motivations and goals. Jesse and Köhler even talked about the "construct of a democratic council movement". Certainly, the authors also excluded a "relapse to the positions of the 1950s: "The councils were neither communist oriented to a large extent nor can the policies of the majority SPD in every aspect be labelled fortuitous and worth praising."

Heinrich August Winkler tried to find a compromise, according to which the Social Democrats depended to a limited extent on cooperation with the old elites but went considerably too far: "With more political willpower they could have changed more and preserved less."

With all the differences concerning details, historical researchers agree that in the German Revolution, the chances to put the republic on a firm footing were considerably better than the dangers coming from the extreme left. Instead, the alliance of the SPD with the old elites constituted a considerable structural problem for the Weimar Republic.

See also

Finnish Civil War
Greater Poland uprising (1918–1919)
Hungarian Soviet Republic
Silesian Uprisings
Revolutions of 1917–1923

References

Further reading

English language literature

Boak, Helen L. "Women in the German Revolution." in The German Revolution and Political Theory (Palgrave Macmillan, Cham, 2019) pp. 25–44.

Chris Harman 

Paul Frölich: Rosa Luxemburg – Her Life and Work, Hesperides Press, 
Gerwarth, Robert. November 1918: The German Revolution (Oxford University Press, USA, 2020).
Halperin, S. William. Germany Tried Democracy: A Political History of the Reich from 1918 to 1933 (1946) online.
Hoffrogge, Ralf: Working-Class Politics in the German Revolution, Richard Müller, the Revolutionary Shop Stewards and the Origins of the Council Movement, Brill Publishers, Leiden 2014, .
Hoffrogge, Ralf: From Unionism to Workers' Councils – The Revolutionary Shop Stewards in Germany 1914–1918, in: Immanuel Ness, Dario Azzellini (Ed): Ours to Master and to Own: Worker's Control from the Commune to the Present, Haymarket Books Chicago 2011.
Jones, Mark: Founding Weimar. Violence and the German Revolution of 1918–19, Cambridge University Press, Cambridge 2016, 
Kets, Gaard and James Muldoon, eds. The German Revolution and Political Theory (2019) excerpt

German language literature

Max von Baden: Erinnerungen und Dokumente, Berlin u. Leipzig 1927
Eduard Bernstein: Die deutsche Revolution von 1918/19. Geschichte der Entstehung und ersten Arbeitsperiode der deutschen Republik. Herausgegeben und eingeleitet von Heinrich August Winkler und annotiert von Teresa Löwe. Bonn 1998, 
Pierre Broué: Die Deutsche Revolution 1918–1923, in: Aufstand der Vernunft Nr. 3. Hrsg.: Der Funke e.V., Eigenverlag, Wien 2005
: Wir Untertanen und Eining gegen Recht und Freiheit – Ein Deutsches Anti-Geschichtsbuch. Frankfurt 1982 und 1981, 
Sebastian Haffner: Die deutsche Revolution 1918/1919 – wie war es wirklich? Ein Beitrag zur deutschen Geschichte München 1979; also published under the titles Die verratene Revolution – Deutschland 1918/19 (1969), 1918/1919 – eine deutsche Revolution (1981, 1986, 1988), Der Verrat. Deutschland 1918/19 (1993, 2002), Der Verrat. 1918/1919 – als Deutschland wurde, wie es ist (1994, 1995), Die deutsche Revolution – 1918/19 (2002, 2004, 2008)
Gerhard Hirschfeld, Gerd Krumeich and Irina Renz, 1918. Die Deutschen zwischen Weltkrieg und Revolution. Chr. Links Verlag, Berlin 2018, .
Institut für Marxismus-Leninismus beim ZK der SED (Hg.): Illustrierte Geschichte der deutschen Novemberrevolution 1918/1919. Berlin: Dietz Verlag, 1978.
Mark Jones:  Am Anfang war Gewalt. Die deutsche Revolution 1918/19 und der Beginn der Weimarer Republik, Propyläen, Berlin 2017, 
: Erlebnisse eines Sozialdemokraten. Zweiter Band, Stuttgart 1948
Harry Graf Kessler: Tagebücher 1918 bis 1937. Frankfurt am Main 1982
Ulrich Kluge: Soldatenräte und Revolution. Studien zur Militärpolitik in Deutschland 1918/19. Göttingen 1975, 
Ulrich Kluge: Die deutsche Revolution 1918/1919. Frankfurt am Main 1985, 
Eberhard Kolb: Die Weimarer Republik. München 2002, 
Ottokar Luban: Die ratlose Rosa. Die KPD-Führung im Berliner Januaraufstand 1919. Legende und Wirklichkeit. Hamburg 2001, 
Erich Matthias (Hrsg.): Die Regierung der Volksbeauftragten 1918/19. 2 Bände, Düsseldorf 1969 (Quellenedition)
Wolfgang Michalka u. Gottfried Niedhart (Hg.): Deutsche Geschichte 1918–1933. Dokumente zur Innen- und Außenpolitik, Frankfurt am Main 1992 
Hans Mommsen: Die verspielte Freiheit. Der Weg der Republik von Weimar in den Untergang 1918 bis 1933. Berlin 1989, 
Hermann Mosler: Die Verfassung des Deutschen Reichs vom 11. August 1919, Stuttgart 1988 
Carl von Ossietzky: Ein Lesebuch für unsere Zeit. Aufbau-Verlag Berlin-Weimar 1989
Detlev J.K. Peukert: Die Weimarer Republik. Krisenjahre der klassischen Moderne. Frankfurt am Main 1987, 
Gerhard A. Ritter/Susanne Miller (editors/compilers): Die deutsche Revolution 1918–1919. Dokumente. 2nd edition substantially extended and reworked, Frankfurt am Main 1983, 
Arthur Rosenberg: Geschichte der Weimarer Republik. Frankfurt am Main 1961 (Erstausgabe: Karlsbad 1935),  [zeitgenössische Deutung]
Hagen Schulze: Weimar. Deutschland 1917–1933, Berlin 1982
: Demokratie im Widerstreit. Die Weimarer Republik im Urteil der Zeitgenossen. Stuttgart 1993
: Antidemokratisches Denken in der Weimarer Republik. Die politischen Ideen des deutschen Nationalismus zwischen 1918 und 1933, München 1962
Volker Ullrich: Die nervöse Großmacht. Aufstieg und Untergang des deutschen Kaisserreichs 1871–1918, Frankfurt am Main 1997 
Richard Wiegand: "Wer hat uns verraten ..." – Die Sozialdemokratie in der Novemberrevolution. New edition: Ahriman-Verlag, Freiburg i.Br 2001, 
Heinrich August Winkler: Weimar 1918–1933.'' München 1993

External links

Gallus, Alexander: Revolutions (Germany), in: 1914-1918-online. International Encyclopedia of the First World War.
Tunstall, Graydon A.: The Military Collapse of the Central Powers, in: 1914-1918-online. International Encyclopedia of the First World War.
Weinhauer, Klaus: Labour Movements and Strikes, Social Conflict and Control, Protest and Repression (Germany), in: 1914-1918-online. International Encyclopedia of the First World War.
Jones, Mark: Kiel Mutiny, in: 1914-1918-online. International Encyclopedia of the First World War.
An overview of the German Revolution by Gerhard Rempel of Western New England College
Library of materials on the German Revolution at marxists.org
Archive of texts on the German Revolution at libcom.org
Homepage from Kiel Interview with one of the leaders of the mutiny in Kiel: Lothar Popp; CV of Lothar Popp; interviews with other contemporary witnesses; evaluations; time-line
Bernhard Grau, Revolution, 1918/1919, published 9 May 2008, English version published 4 March 2020 ; in: Historisches Lexikon Bayerns

 
20th-century revolutions
Communist revolutions
Conflicts in 1918
Conflicts in 1919
Revolution of 1918-1919
Revolution of 1918-1919
Proxy wars
1918-1919
White Terror